The São Toméan ambassador in Beijing was the official representative of the Government in São Tomé to the Government of China.

List of representatives

China–São Tomé and Príncipe relations

References 

 
China
São Tomé and Príncipe